Love in a Fallen City is an upcoming Chinese television series based on the novel of the same name by Chun Shanling. It is set to air on Youku. The series stars Ethan Ruan, Zhu Xudan and Wang Tianchen.

Synopsis
This is a story of a general and an ordinary girl, and their perseverance and motivation for each other.

Cast
Ethan Ruan as Lu Haoting
Zhu Xudan as Gu Wanyi
Wang Tianchen as Huo Zhongqi
Qin Han
Sun Chun
Luo Haiqiong
Dong Yong 
Kingone Wang
Lin Xinlei 
Wang Guan 
Chen Xingxu

References

Upcoming television series
2020 Chinese television series debuts
Chinese period television series
Chinese romance television series
Chinese war television series